Society for the Preservation of Downtown Los Angeles, also known as SP-DTLA, is a 501(c)(3) organization that advocates what it characterizes as responsible and respectful development around and among Downtown Los Angeles' historic structures.  SP-DTLA supports development with a positive impact on the designated Los Angeles Historic-Cultural Monuments in Downtown Los Angeles, especially those in the Historic Core.

SP-DTLA supports viewshed protection and a "zone of respect" around preserved buildings.

SP-DTLA's particular focus is on the seven by four block area (3rd to Olympic Streets and Hill to Main Streets), which includes the Broadway Theater District.

Current Causes

SP-DTLA is best known for its opposition to the Alexan South Broadway project in proximity to the 1930 Eastern Columbia Building and its landmark clock.  The group is also opposing two other downtown projects which they argue have a height and mass out of scale with the character of the adjacent historic buildings.

References

External links
 SP-DTLA Facebook Page

Downtown Los Angeles
Buildings and structures in Downtown Los Angeles
Historic preservation organizations in the United States
Urban planning in California
Organizations based in Los Angeles
Non-profit organizations based in Los Angeles
Organizations established in 2015
2015 establishments in California